Elizabeth Mary Deignan  (née Armitstead; born 18 December 1988) is an English professional world champion track and road racing cyclist, who rides for UCI Women's WorldTeam . She was the 2015 World road race champion.

Deignan is also the 2014 Commonwealth Games road race champion and a twice winner of the season-long UCI Women's Road World Cup, winning the overall competition in 2014 and the final edition in 2015. At the 2012 Summer Olympics, Deignan won the silver medal in the road race. She has won the British National Road Race Championships four times, in 2011, 2013, 2015 and 2017.

In 2021, Deignan won the first ever Paris–Roubaix Femmes to add to victories in the women's versions of Tour of Flanders and Liège–Bastogne–Liège, becoming the first woman to win a 'triple crown' of all women's Monument classics. Twice winner of The Women's Tour, the most important stage race for women in the UK, she has also won Strade Bianche Donne, La Course by Le Tour de France and the Trofeo Alfredo Binda-Comune di Cittiglio.

Prior to her road career, Deignan won a total of five medals at the UCI Track Cycling World Championships in 2009 and 2010, including a gold medal in team pursuit in 2009 with Joanna Rowsell and Wendy Houvenaghel.

Early life
Deignan was born in the market town of Otley in West Yorkshire, where she attended Prince Henry's Grammar School, a state comprehensive school. She took up cycling in 2004 after British Cycling's Olympic Talent Team visited the school. She is a graduate of British Cycling's Olympic Podium Programme.

Career

2005–2009: Track years

Deignan won a silver medal in the scratch race at the Junior World Track Championships in 2005, she was under-23 European Scratch Race Champion in 2007 and 2008, and came second in the Points Race in 2007. In the 2008–09 UCI Track Cycling World Cup Classics, she took a total of seven gold medals after competing in three of the five meetings.

Deignan was a member of the gold medal-winning team pursuit squad at the 2009 UCI Track Cycling World Championships, her second appearance at a senior world championship event. She also competed in the scratch race, where despite being brought down in the closing stages of the race, she jumped back on to claim the silver medal. She completed the championships with a full set of medals, winning bronze in the points race whilst riding with her right wrist numb and strapped up – she was only able to move her forefinger and thumb.

2009–2011: Move to road
Alongside her breakthrough in the velodrome, Deignan was also making progress in road racing: in 2008 she was part of the team which delivered Nicole Cooke to the road race gold at the World Championships in Varese, Italy, and the following year she joined the  cycling team and rode a number of top level road races. She won the under 23 category of the British National Road Race Championships and the silver medal in the senior category after some controversy. That season she also took a stage of the Tour de l'Ardèche and won the youth classification of the Giro d'Italia. During the winter of 2009–10, Deignan returned to the track, taking two golds at the Manchester round of the 2009–10 UCI Track Cycling World Cup Classics and two silvers at the 2010 UCI Track Cycling World Championships. That year she won three more stages of the Tour de l'Ardèche and a silver medal in the road race at the 2010 Commonwealth Games in Delhi. Deignan decided to stay with the franchise in its new guise as  throughout 2011.

2012
Following the discontinuation of the  women's team, Deignan rode for the  team in 2012. Deignan built the whole of her campaign around the 2012 Summer Olympics, taking spring classics wins at the Omloop van het Hageland and Gent–Wevelgem: at the Games themselves, she would go on to win the silver medal in the road race at the Olympics, behind Marianne Vos, in so becoming the first Briton to win a medal at the 2012 Games.

2013
Having had to move teams in the past two seasons due to teams disbanding, Deignan signed for the  team for the 2013 season. Her 2013 season was affected by a recurring stomach illness which was eventually diagnosed as a symptom of a hiatal hernia. Even with her well documented medical concerns, Deignan emerged victorious at the British National Road Race Championships in Glasgow – claiming her second white, red and blue jersey.

2014

In April 2014 it was announced that Deignan had renewed her contract with  until the end of 2016. Deignan enjoyed a career-best year, starting with a win at the Omloop van het Hageland. A week later she also won the first World Cup race of the season, the Ronde van Drenthe, after teammate Ellen van Dijk closed a significant gap for her in the final kilometres of the race. At the third World Cup race, the Tour of Flanders, she finished second behind van Dijk. A week later she won the women's road race at the Commonwealth Games. Deignan won the UCI Women's Road World Cup with a race to spare on 24 August 2014. An 8th-place finish in the Open de Suède Vårgårda was enough to secure the overall title.

2015
For the 2015 season, Deignan stated again her intention to build towards the UCI Road World Championships. She claimed the first overall win of her career taking the Ladies Tour of Qatar stage race, as well as winning two stages. Deignan then went on to take victories at the one day World Cup races Trofeo Alfredo Binda-Comune di Cittiglio and Philadelphia Cycling Classic, along with the Holland Hills Classic.

In June, Deignan was forced to pull out of The Women's Tour after colliding with a group of photographers seconds after winning the first stage of the tour in Suffolk. However, ten days later she had recovered sufficiently to win convincingly the British National Road Race Championships for the third time taking her to the top of the UCI world rankings. In August, she sprinted to victory in the final World Cup race of the season, the GP de Plouay, to retain her World Cup title ahead of her main challenger, Anna van der Breggen.

To cap her best season to date, on 26 September, Deignan won the World Championships road race in Richmond, Virginia, USA, beating van der Breggen in a sprint from a small group of nine riders at the finish line, becoming the fourth British woman to win the world road race title after Beryl Burton, Mandy Jones and Nicole Cooke.

2016
Deignan's stated aim for the 2016 season was the road race at the Olympic Games, and she started the season as she had finished off the previous one, securing a number of one day race wins, as well as a General classification victory, breaking any curse of the rainbow jersey. Deignan took four victories in the inaugural UCI Women's World Tour; Strade Bianche, Trofeo Alfredo Binda, Tour of Flanders and the overall title at The Women's Tour. Deignan also took victories in the Holland Hills Classic and Omloop Het Nieuwsblad. At the Games, she finished just outside the medals in fifth place.

Missed drugs tests
In 2016, Deignan avoided a ban from cycling that would have prevented her from competing in the Olympic Games. The charges against her were that she missed three drugs tests within a 12-month period (20 August 2015, 5 October 2015 and 9 June 2016), an offence that could have led to a four-year ban. However, at the Court of Arbitration for Sport, Deignan argued that the first missed test was not a fault of her own but rather that of the testing authorities. She accepted the other two instances. The CAS agreed with her on the first count, and it was declared not to have been a missed test, clearing her to compete. The decision has drawn criticism from various quarters.

In a 5 August 2016 interview, she said she believes that people will doubt her status as a clean sportsperson forever. World squash champion James Willstrop wrote in defence of Deignan, arguing that the complexity of testing procedures can easily lead to missed tests and noting that she had 16 clean tests in 2016.

2017
Deignan endured a difficult start to her 2017 season: after finishing third at Strade Bianche, she fell ill, which hampered her training. However, her form picked up for the Ardennes classics, finishing second to team-mate van der Breggen in the Amstel Gold Race, La Flèche Wallonne Féminine and Liège–Bastogne–Liège. She subsequently took her first win of the season on home ground at the Tour de Yorkshire in April, crossing the line solo almost a minute ahead of her nearest rivals.

The following month she finished second at La Course by Le Tour de France, finishing behind winner Annemiek van Vleuten on the Col d'Izoard: she stated that she was "surprised" by her performance, having never enjoyed success on a mountaintop finish before. In August she took her first World Tour win of the season at the GP de Plouay – Bretagne, breaking away from rivals alongside Pauline Ferrand-Prévot on the final climb, before outsprinting Ferrand-Prévot to cross the finish line first. She became the third woman to win the race twice, alongside Vos and Pooley. However, the remainder of her season was disrupted shortly afterwards after being struck with appendicitis whilst competing in the Holland Ladies Tour.

2021
Deignan was chosen to be part of the UK's cycling squad at the postponed 2020 Tokyo Olympics where she contested the road race with Anna Shackley as a team mate. The race finished with an unexpected winner in Anna Kiesenhofer of Austria, with Deignan finding the conditions humid and difficult. She finished 11th in the race.

Deignan therefore became the first woman to win a 'triple crown' of all women's Monument classics, having won the 2016 Tour of Flanders for Women, and the 2020 Liège–Bastogne–Liège Femmes.

2022
In February, Deignan announced that she would sit out the 2022 season, as she was pregnant with her second child.

Personal life
She married fellow professional road racing cyclist Philip Deignan in Otley on 17 September 2016. The couple have two children: a daughter, born in September 2018, and a son, born in September 2022.

She splits her time between Otley and Monaco. Deignan has been a pescetarian for ethical reasons since the age of ten.

Career achievements

Major results

Track

2005
 National Junior Championships
1st  Points race
2nd 500m time trial
3rd Scratch 
 2nd  Scratch, UCI World Junior Championships
2006
 2nd Scratch, National Championships
 National Junior Championships
2nd Points race
2nd Individual pursuit
3rd Scratch
3rd 500m time trial
2007
 UEC European Under-23 Championships
1st  Scratch
2nd  Points race
2008
 UEC European Under-23 Championships
1st  Scratch
1st  Team pursuit
2nd  Points race
 2008–09 UCI World Cup Classics
1st Points race, Manchester
1st Scratch, Manchester
1st Team pursuit, Manchester
1st [Scratch, Melbourne
1st Team pursuit, Melbourne
2009
 UCI World Championships
1st  Team pursuit
2nd  Scratch
3rd  Points race
 2008–09 UCI World Cup Classics, Copenhagen
1st Scratch
1st Team pursuit
 2009–10 UCI World Cup Classics, Manchester
1st Team pursuit
1st Points race
2010
 UCI World Championships
2nd  Team pursuit
2nd  Omnium
2011
 National Championships
1st  Points race
1st  Scratch
2015
 Revolution Series
1st Points race, Manchester
1st Points race, Glasgow
3rd Scratch, Glasgow

Road
Source: 

2006
 1st  National Criterium Championships
 1st WCRA Criterium Championships
2007
 1st  National Criterium Championships
 5th Omloop van Borsele
 6th Road race, UEC European Under-23 Championships
2009
 1st  Road race, National Under-23 Championships
 1st  Young rider classification, Giro d'Italia
 2nd Road race, National Championships
 3rd Overall Tour de l'Ardèche
1st  Points classification
1st Stage 6
 8th Omloop van Borsele
 8th Chrono Champenois
 9th Tour de Berne
2010
 1st  Road race, National Under-23 Championships
 1st Stage 1 Tour de l'Aude
 2nd  Road race, Commonwealth Games
 2nd Road race, National Championships
 4th Overall La Route de France
1st Stage 6
 4th Overall Tour de l'Ardèche
1st  Points classification
1st Stages 3, 4 & 5
 5th Emakumeen Saria
 7th Overall Ster Zeeuwsche Eilanden
 7th Grand Prix Elsy Jacobs
 9th Road race, UCI World Championships
2011
 1st  Road race, National Championships
 Thüringen Rundfahrt der Frauen
1st  Points classification
1st Stage 6
 1st Stage 1 Tour of Chongming Island Stage race
 2nd Tour of Chongming Island World Cup
 3rd Open de Suède Vårgårda TTT
 4th Omloop van Borsele
 6th GP Ciudad de Valladolid
 7th Road race, UCI World Championships
 7th GP Stad Roeselare
 10th Ronde van Drenthe
2012
 1st Omloop van het Hageland
 1st Gent–Wevelgem
 Olympic Games
2nd  Road race
10th Time trial
 2nd Road race, National Championships
 3rd Novilon Euregio Cup
 4th Overall Thüringen Rundfahrt der Frauen
 4th Gooik–Geraardsbergen–Gooik
 4th Durango-Durango Emakumeen Saria
 6th Overall Ster Zeeuwsche Eilanden
 8th GP Stad Roeselare
 10th Omloop Het Nieuwsblad
2013
 National Championships
1st  Road race
2nd Time trial
 2nd Holland Hills Classic
 2nd Ridderronde Maastricht
 3rd Overall Holland Ladies Tour
1st  Sprints classification
1st  Combination classification
 6th Overall La Route de France
 7th Overall Energiewacht Tour
 Combativity award, Stage 2
 7th Ronde van Drenthe
 9th Tour of Flanders
2014
 1st  Overall UCI World Cup
 1st  Road race, Commonwealth Games
 1st Omloop van het Hageland
 1st Ronde van Drenthe
 1st Otley Grand Prix
 2nd Overall Thüringen Rundfahrt
1st  Points classification
1st  Mountains classification
1st Stage 1
 2nd Trofeo Alfredo Binda
 2nd Tour of Flanders
 2nd La Flèche Wallonne
 2nd Durango-Durango Emakumeen Saria
 3rd Road race, National Championships
 3rd Drentse 8
 3rd Omloop Het Nieuwsblad
 3rd RideLondon Grand Prix
 3rd Open de Suède Vårgårda TTT
 7th Road race, UCI World Championships
 8th Open de Suède Vårgårda
 8th GP de Plouay
2015
 UCI World Championships
1st  Road race
2nd  Team time trial
 1st  Overall UCI World Cup
 1st  Road race, National Championships
 1st  Overall Tour of Qatar
1st  Points classification
1st Stages 3 & 4
 1st Trofeo Alfredo Binda
 1st Holland Hills Classic
 1st Philadelphia Cycling Classic
 1st GP de Plouay
 1st Stage 1 The Women's Tour
 2nd Strade Bianche
 3rd Omloop Het Nieuwsblad
 3rd Crescent Vårgårda TTT
 4th La Course by Le Tour de France
 7th Ronde van Drenthe
 8th Tour of Flanders
2016
 UCI World Championships
1st  Team time trial
4th Road race
 1st  Overall The Women's Tour
1st  British rider classification
1st Stage 3
 1st Omloop Het Nieuwsblad
 1st Strade Bianche
 1st Trofeo Alfredo Binda
 1st Tour of Flanders
 1st Holland Hills Classic
 1st Crescent Vårgårda TTT
 1st Stage 2 (TTT) Holland Ladies Tour
 5th Road race, Olympic Games
2017
 1st  Road race, National Championships
 1st Tour de Yorkshire
 1st GP de Plouay
 1st Stage 1 (TTT) Giro Rosa
 2nd La Course by Le Tour de France
 2nd Amstel Gold Race
 2nd La Flèche Wallonne
 2nd Liège–Bastogne–Liège
 3rd Strade Bianche
2019
 1st  Overall The Women's Tour
1st  Points classification
1st  British rider classification
1st Stage 5
 7th Overall Holland Ladies Tour
 7th Liège–Bastogne–Liège
2020
 1st  Overall UCI World Tour
 1st Liège–Bastogne–Liège
 1st GP de Plouay
 1st La Course by Le Tour de France
 1st Stage 1 (TTT) Giro Rosa
 4th La Flèche Wallonne
 6th Road race, UCI World Championships
 8th Gent–Wevelgem
 9th Emakumeen Nafarroako Klasikoa
2021
 1st  Overall Tour de Suisse
1st  Points classification
1st  Mountains classification
 1st Paris–Roubaix
 4th Overall Giro Rosa
1st Stage 1 (TTT)
 7th GP de Plouay
 9th Overall Thüringen Ladies Tour
 9th La Course by Le Tour de France

Classics results timeline

Awards and honours
In 2015, Deignan was nominated for the 2015 BBC Sports Personality of the Year Award, following her world championship victory; she finished tenth, with approximately 22,000 of the 1.009 million votes cast.

In December 2022, Deignan was appointed as a Member of the Order of the British Empire (MBE) in the 2023 New Year Honours for services to cycling.

References

External links

Rider biography  British Cycling
Profile MTC (management company)

1988 births
Living people
British cycling road race champions
People from Otley
Commonwealth Games silver medallists for England
Cyclists at the 2012 Summer Olympics
Cyclists at the 2016 Summer Olympics
Cyclists at the 2020 Summer Olympics
Olympic cyclists of Great Britain
English Olympic medallists
Olympic silver medallists for Great Britain
Olympic medalists in cycling
English female cyclists
Cyclists at the 2010 Commonwealth Games
Medalists at the 2012 Summer Olympics
Cyclists from Yorkshire
Cyclists at the 2014 Commonwealth Games
UCI Track Cycling World Champions (women)
UCI Road World Champions (women)
Commonwealth Games gold medallists for England
Commonwealth Games medallists in cycling
English track cyclists
People educated at Prince Henry's Grammar School, Otley
Sportspeople from West Yorkshire
Members of the Order of the British Empire
Medallists at the 2010 Commonwealth Games
Medallists at the 2014 Commonwealth Games